Pomigliano Airfield (40°55'40"N / 14°23'20"E) was a military airfield and base established in 1938–39 in Pomigliano d'Arco, southern Italy near Naples. It was attacked on several occasions by the United States Army Air Force.  The airfield was later used by the USAAF Twelfth Air Force during the Italian campaign.

Major USAAF units stationed at the airfield were:

 HQ, XXII Tactical Air Command, August-4 October 1945
 HQ, 57th Bombardment Wing, 23 August-12 September 1945
 HQ, 62d Fighter Wing, August-12 September 1945
 310th Bombardment Group, 15 August–12 September 1945, B-25 Mitchell
 321st Bombardment Group, September 1945, B-25 Mitchell
 27th Fighter Bomber Group, 19 January 1944 – 10 April 1944
 31st Fighter Group, 14 October 1943 – 14 October 1943, Spitfire
 79th Fighter Group, 1 May–June 1944
 86th Fighter-Bomber Group, 19 November 1943 – 30 April 1944, A-36 Apache
 3d Reconnaissance Group, 4 January-16 June 1944 (various photo-recon aircraft)
 60th Troop Carrier Group, 8 October 1944 – 23 May 1945, C-47 Skytrain

After the war the airfield was used for aviation development, and in the late 1960s the new Alfasud automobile factory was built on the site, which obliterated all traces of the airfield.

References

 https://www.facebook.com/pg/dedicatoapomigliano/photos/?tab=album&album_id=383207945089335

Airfields of the United States Army Air Forces in Italy